Iqaluit is the capital of the Canadian territory of Nunavut, its largest community, and its only city. It was known as Frobisher Bay from 1942 to 1987, after the large bay on the coast on which the city is situated. In 1987, its traditional Inuktitut name was restored.

In 1999, Iqaluit was designated the capital of Nunavut after the division of the Northwest Territories into two separate territories. Before this event, Iqaluit was a small city and not well known outside the Canadian Arctic or Canada, with population and economic growth highly limited. This is due to the city's isolation and heavy dependence on expensive imported supplies, as the city, like the rest of Nunavut, has no road or rail, and only has ship connections for part of the year to the rest of Canada. The city has a polar climate, influenced by the cold deep waters of the Labrador Current just off Baffin Islandthis makes the city of Iqaluit cold, although it is well south of the Arctic Circle.

As of the 2021 Canadian census, the population was 7,429 (population centre: 6,991), a decrease of 4.0 per cent from the 2016 census. Iqaluit has the lowest population of any capital city in Canada. Inhabitants of Iqaluit are called Iqalummiut (singular: Iqalummiuq).

History 
Iqaluit has been a traditional fishing location used by Inuit and their predecessors, the Paleo-Eskimo (Dorset culture) and Thule, for thousands of years. The name, Iqaluit, comes from Inuktitut Iqaluit (ᐃᖃᓗᐃᑦ) which means place of many fish.

World War II resulted in an influx of non-Inuit to the area in 1942, when the United States built Frobisher Bay Air Base there, on a long-term lease from the Government of Canada, in order to provide a stop-over and refuelling site for the short-range aircraft being ferried to Europe to support the war effort. Iqaluit's first permanent resident was Nakasuk, an Inuk guide who helped United States Army Air Forces planners to choose a site with a large flat area suitable for a landing strip. The wartime airstrip was known as Crystal Two, was part of the Crimson Route and operates today as Iqaluit Airport.

It had long been used as a campsite and fishing spot by the Inuit, who called it Iqaluit – "place of many fish" in Inuktitut. The US and Canadian authorities named it Frobisher Bay, after the name of the body of water it borders.

In 1949, after the war, the Hudson's Bay Company moved its south Baffin operations to the neighbouring valley of Niaqunngut, officially called Apex, in order to use the airfield. In the mid-1950s, the population of Frobisher Bay increased rapidly during the construction of the Distant Early Warning Line (DEW line), a system of defensive radar stations—see North American Aerospace Defense Command (NORAD).

Hundreds of mostly non-Inuit construction workers, military personnel, and administrative staff moved into the community, and several hundred Inuit followed, to take advantage of the access to jobs and medical care provided by the base operations. By 1957, 489 of the town's 1,200 residents were reported to be Inuit. After 1959, the Canadian government established permanent services at Frobisher Bay, including full-time doctors, a school, and social services. The Inuit population grew rapidly in response, as the government encouraged Inuit to settle permanently in communities supported by government services.

Naval Radio Station (NRS) Frobisher Bay (HMCS Frobisher Bay), callsign CFI, was established in July 1954 as a result of the closure of NRS Chimo, Quebec. Station CFI was part of the Supplementary Radio network. Because of its remoteness and size, it was very expensive to operate. Renamed CFS Frobisher Bay in 1966, advancing technology eventually forced the closure of CFI later that year.

The American military left Iqaluit in 1963, as their development of the intercontinental ballistic missiles (ICBM) diminished the strategic value of the DEW line and Arctic airbases. Canada continued to operate an administrative and logistical centre for much of the eastern Arctic at Frobisher Bay. In 1964, the first local elections were held for a community council, and in 1979 for the first mayor. The founding of the Gordon Robertson Educational Centre, now Inuksuk High School, in the early 1970s at Iqaluit confirmed the government's commitment to the community as an administrative centre. At the time of its founding, this was the sole high school operating in what constituted more than one-seventh of Canadian territory.

On 1 January 1987, the name of the municipality was changed from "Frobisher Bay" to "Iqaluit" – aligning official usage with the name that the Inuit population had always used. (Many documents were made that referred to Iqaluit as Frobisher Bay for several years after 1987). In the non-binding 1995 Nunavut capital plebiscite, held 11 December, the residents of what would become the new territory selected Iqaluit (over Rankin Inlet) to serve as the future capital. On 19 April 2001, it was designated a city.

Canada designated Iqaluit as the host city for the 2010 meeting of the Group of Seven finance ministers, held on 5–6 February. The requirements for the international meeting strained the northern communications technology infrastructure and required supplemental investment.

Timeline 
1576 – Englishman Martin Frobisher sails into Frobisher Bay believing he has found the westward route to China. He held the first Anglican church service in North America here.
1861 – Charles Francis Hall, an American, camps at the Sylvia Grinnell River and explores the waters of Koojesse Inlet, which he names after his Inuit guide.
1942 – The United States Army Air Forces selects this area as the site of a major air base to support war efforts in the United Kingdom and Europe.
1949 – The Hudson's Bay Company (HBC) moves its trading post from Ward Inlet to nearby Apex.
1955 – Frobisher Bay becomes the centre for the United States/Canada DEW Line construction operations. Many Inuit continue to settle here for local services.
1958 – Telephone exchange service established by Bell Canada.
1963 – United States military move out, resulting in some population loss.
1964 – First community council formed; the population of Frobisher Bay is 900.
1970 – Frobisher Bay officially recognized as a settlement.
1974 – Settlement of Frobisher Bay gains village status.
1976 – Inuit present a proposal for a separate Nunavut Territory to the Federal government.
1979 – The first mayor elected, Bryan Pearson.
1980 – Frobisher Bay designated as a town.
1982 – Government of Canada agrees in principle to the creation of Nunavut.
1987 – Frobisher Bay is renamed as Iqaluit, its original Inuktitut name meaning "place of (many) fish".
1993 – The Nunavut Land Claims Agreement is signed in Iqaluit.
1995 – Nunavut residents select Iqaluit as the capital of the new territory
1 April 1999 – The Territory of Nunavut is established.
19 April 2001 – Iqaluit is chartered as a city.
2002 – Iqaluit, along with Nuuk, Greenland, co-host the first jointly hosted Arctic Winter Games; the Arctic Winter Games Arena was constructed in Iqaluit for the event.
5 February 2010 – Canada designates Iqaluit to host the finance meeting as part of the 2010 Group of Seven summit.
29 July 2022 - Pope Francis visited Iqaluit to meet with a group of former residential school alumni on his penitential apostolic visit to Canada. He was the first Pope to visit Nunavut.

Geography 

Iqaluit is the northernmost city in Canada, at 63 degrees north of the Equator. Iqaluit is located in the Everett Mountains, which rise from Koojesse Inlet, an inlet of Frobisher Bay, on the southeast part of Baffin Island. It is well to the east of Nunavut's mainland, and northeast of Hudson Bay.

Climate 

Iqaluit has a tundra climate (Köppen: ET) typical of the Arctic region, although it is well outside the Arctic Circle. The city features long, cold winters and brief, cool summers. Average monthly temperatures are below freezing for eight months of the year. Temperatures of the winter months are comparable to other northern communities further west on the continent such as Yellowknife and to some extent even Fairbanks, Alaska, even though Iqaluit is a few degrees colder than the latter. Summer temperatures are, however, much colder due to its easterly maritime position affected by the waters of the cold Baffin Island Current. This means that the tree line is much further south in the eastern part of Canada, being as southbound, in spite of low elevation, as northern Labrador.

Although it is north of the natural tree line, there are some short, south-facing imported black spruce (Picea mariana) specimens protected by snowdrifts in the winter, in addition to a few shrubs, which are woody plants. These include the Arctic willow (Salix arctica), which is hard to recognize as a tree because of its low height.

The climate of Iqaluit is also colder than Gulf Stream locations on the same latitude. For example, the Norwegian city of Trondheim has an annual mean temperature that is  milder.

Cityscape

Neighbourhoods

Downtown (central)
Happy Valley (north)
Lake Subdivision (north) – residential area
Lower Base (south)
Lower Iqaluit (southeast)
North 40 (northwest) – located on the north side of the airport
Plateau Subdivision (northwest) – residential area
Road To Nowhere (north)
Tundra Valley (west)
Tundra Ridge (west) – home to two of the city's schools and youth centre
West 40 (southwest) – commercial area

Suburbs 
It is located on a small peninsula separating Koojesse Inlet from Tarr Inlet. There is a women's shelter, a church, a primary school (Nanook Elementary School), a design shop and a bed and breakfast in the community. Apex was where most Inuit lived when Iqaluit was a military site and off-limits to anyone not working at the base.

Architecture and attractions

Much of Iqaluit's architecture is functionaldesigned to minimize material costs, while retaining heat and withstanding the climate. Early architecture runs from the 1950s military barracks of the original DEW line installation, through the 1970s white hyper-modernist fibreglass block of the Nakasuk School and Municipal Offices and Arena, to the lines of the steel-reinforced concrete high-rise complex on the hill above it. A number of older Hudson's Bay Company and early 1950s buildings have been retained and restored in Apex (the former nursing station has been revived as the Rannva Bed and Breakfast, the HBC buildings as an art gallery). The newer buildings are more colourful and diverse, and closer to the norms of southern architecture.

The principal exception is the Nunavut Legislative Assembly Building, which is remarkable for its colourful interior, adorned with some of the very best in Inuit art. A new legislative building is in planning to be developed and built outside the city on the Apex Road.

Another distinctive building was St. Jude's Anglican Cathedral, see of the Anglican Diocese of The Arctic, which was a white building shaped like an igloo. The altar was built by the parishioners, under the guidance of Markoosie Peter, a traditional master carpenter. It was shaped like a traditional Inuit sled, and the cross composed of two crossed narwhal tusks. An incident of arson severely affected the Cathedral structure and interior on 5 November 2005, and it was demolished on 1 June 2006. The cathedral is slowly being rebuilt (foundation 2008 superstructure 2010) and fund-raising continues locally and internationally. In December 2010, the exterior of a similarly shaped replacement cathedral was completed, and interior work was planned for 2011 with a potential opening for Christmas 2011. The current building, informally referred to as the Igloo Cathedral, was opened on 3 June 2012. The unique building, in the shape of an igloo, has traditionally been a landmark and tourist attraction in Iqaluit, besides its important spiritual role for Iqalummiut (people of Iqaluit).

On a ridge overlooking the city is the distinctive blue and white Inuksuk High School. The school is made up of four square sections joined that give a cloverleaf shape when viewed from the air.

The city is also the location of the Nunatta Sunakkutaangit Museum, which houses a large collection of Inuit and Arctic objects. The museum is housed in a restored and extended Hudson's Bay Company building, clad in the HBC signature red and white, transported to Iqaluit from its original site on the Apex Beach.

Just west of Iqaluit is the Sylvia Grinnell Territorial Park. This park is dominated by the valley of the Sylvia Grinnell River. A small visitor's centre with viewing platform is located on top of a hill overlooking scenic waterfalls, tidal flats and traditional fishing sites.

Nearby on an island near Peterhead Inlet, is the Qaummaarviit Territorial Park. It is a site with a long Inuit history and numerous artifacts have been recovered, including the remains of 11 semi-buried sod houses.

A little farther, across Frobisher Bay, are the Katannilik Territorial Park Reserve and the Soper River, a Canadian Heritage River, forming a park corridor linking Iqaluit along traditional overland travel routes with Kimmirut (formerly Lake Harbour). Frobisher Bay extends for almost  to the east, with moderate hills, glaciers and traditional and summer camp sites, opening into the Davis Strait which divides Nunavut from Greenland.

Iqaluit, like many Nunavut communities, has a volunteer-run annual spring festival. Called Toonik Tyme it involves a combination of traditional Inuit activities combined with more modern events, while the Alianait Music and Arts Festival is held for a week each 21 June. The festival has attracted Canadian and international artists such as Joshua Haulli, Quantum Tangle, Washboard Hank and Namgar.

Demographics 

The median value of these dwellings is $376,639, quite a bit higher than the national median at $280,552. The average household has about 2.8 people living in it, and the average family has 1.4 children living at home with them. The median (after-tax) household income in Iqaluit is quite high, $98,921, almost double the national rate at $54,089. The median income for an individual in the city, is also high, $60,688. 5.9 per cent of people (over 15 years old) are either divorced or separated, which is quite a bit lower than the national rate at 8.6 per cent. Also, 53.3 per cent of the population is either married or living with a common law partner.

Iqaluit has quite a young population, the median age of the population is more than 10 years younger than the national rate, 30.1 years old compared to 40.6 years old.

For those over the age of 25:
75.7% are high school educated (15.9% as their highest level of education)
59.8% are post-secondary school educated
24.3% have no certificate, diploma or degree

The 2021 census reported that immigrants (individuals born outside Canada) comprise 750 persons or 10.3% of the total population of Iqaluit. Of the total immigrant population, the top countries of origin were Philippines (195 persons or 26.0%), Cameroon (50 persons or 6.7%), United Kingdom (40 persons or 5.3%), Nigeria (40 persons or 5.3%), Zimbabwe (40 persons or 5.3%), United States of America (35 persons or 4.7%), India (25 persons or 3.3%), Pakistan (20 persons or 2.7%), China (20 persons or 2.7%), Jamaica (20 persons or 2.7%), and Ethiopia (20 persons or 2.7%).

Ethnicity 
As of 2016, Iqaluit has the most Inuit in both numbers (3,900) and per centages (59.1 per cent), of all Canadian cities with populations greater than 5,000.

Note: Totals greater than 100% due to multiple origin responses.

Language 
There is no "majority mother tongue" in Iqaluit, as 45.4 percent reported their mother tongue as being English, and 45.4 percent also reported their mother tongue as Inuktitut. English is spoken by 97.2 percent of Iqalummiuts, however, whereas only 53.1 percent can speak Inuktitut. French was the mother tongue of 4.8 percent of the population, which is the same figure of the population who can speak the language. As of 2012, "Pirurvik, Iqaluit’s Inuktitut language training centre, has a new goal: to train instructors from Nunavut communities to teach Inuktitut in different ways and in their own dialects when they return home."

Religion 
According to the 2021 census, religious groups in Iqaluit included:
Christianity (3,975 persons or 54.4%)
Irreligion (3,060 persons or 41.9%)
Islam (90 persons or 1.2%)
Indigenous Spirituality (50 persons or 0.7%)
Hinduism (30 persons or 0.4%)
Judaism (20 persons or 0.3%)
Buddhism (10 persons or 0.1%)
Other (75 persons or 1.0%)

Education

The Qikiqtani School Operations based in Pond Inlet operates five schools in the area. Nanook Elementary School, located in Apex, Nakasuk School and Joamie Ilinniarvik School offer kindergarten to grade 5. Aqsarniit Ilinniarvik School offers grades 6 to 8 and Inuksuk High School offers grades 9 to 12.

The Commission scolaire francophone du Nunavut runs École des Trois-Soleils and offers kindergarten to grade 12.

At the post-secondary level there are two, Nunavut Arctic College (Nunatta Campus) and Akitsiraq Law School.

Infrastructure

Emergency services

Emergency services (fire and ambulance) are provided by city from a single station on Niaqunngusiariaq.

The emergency services fleet consists of:
1 engine
1 ladder
2 staff vehicles
3 ambulances

Iqaluit Airport Emergency Services is responsible for fire services at the airport. Following a fire at the airport in 1998, the Government of Nunavut re-opened the fire station at the airport. Their fleet consists of:

Waltek C-5500 ARFF
Oshkosh T3000 ARFF

Policing in Iqaluit, as with the rest of Nunavut, is contracted to the Royal Canadian Mounted Police (RCMP) V Division and the city is home to the divisional headquarters.

Medical services
Qikiqtani General Hospital is the primary care facility in the city. There is also a Family Practice Clinic providing primary care services by Nurse Practitioners. Two dental clinics exist in the city.

Sports facilities
Iqaluit features two arenas, the Arctic Winter Games Arena and Arnaitok, the Iqaluit Aquaplex, a curling rink, the Timmianut Pikiuqarvik disc golf course, the Frobisher Inn Fitness Centre, in the W.G. Brown Building/Astro Hill Complex, a golf course, outdoor basketball courts, soccer nets, seasonal outdoor ice rinks, a shooting range, a skatepark, and more.

Transportation

Iqaluit is the smallest Canadian capital in terms of population, and the only capital that is not connected to other settlements by a highway. Located on an island remote from the Canadian highway system, Iqaluit is generally only accessible by aircraft and, subject to ice conditions, by boat.

Iqaluit Airport is a modern facility with a runway long enough for most modern jet aircraft. A new, larger passenger terminal building north of the old terminal was completed in 2018.

Canadian North serves Iqaluit from Ottawa, Yellowknife, and several communities in Nunavut. Locally based airlines Air Nunavut, Canadian Helicopters, Nunasi Helicopters, and Unaalik Aviation provide air charters, and Air Nunavut and Keewatin Air provide MEDIVAC/air ambulance service. Air Canada Jazz provided daily service to Iqaluit from Ottawa in 2010 and 2011, but cancelled service due to rising fuel costs, which prevented the route from being profitable.

Iqaluit shared its runway with the Royal Canadian Air Force until the Canadian Forces stopped using Iqaluit as a Canadian NORAD Region Forward Operating Location. The barracks and CF-188 hangars are maintained. The airport has been a centre for cold-weather testing of new aircraft, such as the Airbus A380 in February 2006.

Rumours that Iqaluit was an emergency landing site for the Space Shuttle are false.

In the middle of summer, a few ships—generally no larger than a Liberty-class vessel—transport bulk and heavy goods to the city. Cargo is currently off-loaded onto barges as the harbour is not deep enough; however, the city is currently constructing a deepwater port which is expected to open in 2022. The port, which will cost approximately $72 million, will provide all-tide access to ships and will have space for one ship to dock and unload, with the ability to offload a second using a barge-and-ramp method. Initial plans for the port included facilities for a vehicle ferry connection to Happy Valley-Goose Bay, Newfoundland and Labrador, however these plans were dropped due to high cost.

Iqaluit has no public transportation, although there is citywide taxi service. Iqaluit Public Transit used to offer bus service in the city, but the service was cancelled due to low ridership. Motor cars are increasing in number, to the extent of causing occasional traffic jams known locally as "the rush minute". The cost of shipping automobiles and the wear-and-tear of the harsh Arctic climate combined with its notoriously rough roadways mean that snowmobiles remain the preferred form of personal transportation. All-terrain vehicles are also common in most of the Canadian Arctic. Snowmobiles are used to travel within the city and in the surrounding area. In winter, dog sleds are still used, but primarily for recreation. In winter, the nearby Qaummaarviit Territorial Park and the more remote Katannilik Territorial Park Reserve are only accessible by snowmobile, dog sled or foot. In the summer, both are accessible by boat. Most major roads within Iqaluit are paved with asphalt, but local and smaller roads are gravel. Roads do not have traffic signals, but use stop signs to control intersections.

Residents and businesses identify their locations mostly by building number, and occasionally by the name of a prominent structure. Residents know where in the city certain series of building numbers are located; numbers tend to be aggregated in blocks, so someone might say that they live in the 2600s. Around 2003, street names were developed, although there were delays in finalizing them and posting the signs. Street numbers have not been assigned, and building numbers continue to be used. Iqaluit is the only Canadian capital city not to have traffic signals, although some have been installed on a temporary basis.

Waste and water treatment
The city's infrastructure is stressed by growth and lack of means to upgrade. Waste from the city is disposed of into an open air dump on Akilliq Drive (West 40) located south of the city.

Although the city has water treatment facilities, raw sewage from the city is often dumped untreated into nearby Frobisher Bay.

Iqaluit does not have a recycling program in place; all recyclable materials are sent into the waste stream.

Media

Communications
Landline services in Iqaluit (established in 1958 by Bell Canada) and throughout northern Canada (established by Northwestel in five western Nunavut communities, and by Bell Canada elsewhere in Nunavut), are provided since 1992 by Northwestel.

Cell service is provided by Ice Wireless, Bell Mobility, and Qiniq.

Internet service is available through Northwestel, Ice Wireless, Qiniq, Xplornet and Meshnet. Meshnet Community WiFi is a free community WiFi and paid service available in most areas of the city. Free services include access to Isuma.tv, and many other resources.

Press
Nunatsiaq News 
News/North

Radio

Television

Iqaluit was served by CFFB-TV channel 8, a CBC Television/CBC North repeater of CFYK-DT (Yellowknife) until 31 July 2012 when it was closed because of budget cuts at the CBC.

Notable people 

Eva Aariak, politician, former Member of the Legislative Assembly (MLA) and second Premier of Nunavut
Paul-André Brasseur, child actor
Ann Meekitjuk Hanson, former Commissioner of Nunavut
Kenn Harper, grocer, amateur historian, and entrepreneur
Lucie Idlout, rock singer, songwriter
Matty McNair, US-born explorer
Mosha Michael, filmmaker
Simonie Michael, first Inuk to be elected to what is now the Legislative Assembly of the Northwest Territories in 1966
Nakasuk, founder of Iqaluit
Paul Okalik, lawyer, politician, member of the Legislative Assembly of Nunavut, first Premier of Nunavut and former Speaker of the Legislative Assembly of Nunavut. Unsuccessful federal Liberal candidate for Nunavut
Abe Okpik, politician, worked on Project Surname to obtain family names for Inuit rather than disc numbers and first Inuk to sit (appointed) on what is now the NWT Legislative Assembly
Dennis Patterson, politician, former MLA and Premier of the NWT (prior to division), current Canadian Senator for Nunavut
Bryan Pearson, politician, former MLA, first mayor of Iqaluit, businessman
Ed Picco, politician, former MLA in NWT and Nunavut
Annabella Piugattuk, actress
Elisapee Sheutiapik, ex-politician & mayor
Enooyaq Sudlovenick, marine biologist
Hunter Tootoo, territorial and federal politician, and former speaker of the Nunavut Legislative Assembly
Sheila Watt-Cloutier, politician, environmental activist, Nobel nominee

See also
List of municipalities in Nunavut

Notes

References

Further reading 

Baffin Regional Health Board (Nunavut), and Health Needs Assessment Project (Nunavut). Iqaluit Community Profile. Iqaluit, Nunavut?: Health Needs Assessment Project, Baffin Regional Health Board?, 1994.
Eno, Robert V. Crystal Two: The Origin of Iqaluit. Arctic. 2003.
Hodgson, D. A. Quaternary geology of western Meta Incognita Peninsula and Iqaluit area, Baffin Island, Nunavut. Ottawa: Geological Survey of Canada, 2005. 
Keen, Jared. Iqaluit Gateway to the Arctic. Calgary: Weigl Educational Publishers Limited, 2000. 
Kublu, Alexina, and Mélanie Gagnon. Inuit Recollections on the Military Presence in Iqaluit. Memory and history in Nunavut, v. 2. Iqaluit, N.W.T.: Nunavut Arctic College, 2002. 
Newbery, Nick. Iqaluit gateway to Baffin. Iqaluit, NT: Published for the Royal Canadian Legion Branch No. 4, Iqaluit by Nortext Pub. Co, 1995.

External links

 
1942 establishments in Canada
Cities in Nunavut
Hudson's Bay Company trading posts in Nunavut
Populated places established in 1942
Populated places in Baffin Island
Road-inaccessible communities of Nunavut